Crunk Rock is the solo debut album and sixth overall album by American crunk artist Lil Jon, released on June 8, 2010 by BME and Universal Republic. The characters at the bottom of the album's cover are Japanese katakana characters, which read "Kurunku Rokku", an approximation of the Japanese transliteration of the album's title.

As of 2022, Crunk Rock remains Lil Jon's latest album release.

Background and recording 
Work on the album began in June 2005. In May 2006, MTV reported that it would be released late that summer or in early fall. At that time he announced that he was relocating to Las Vegas where the album would be recorded, and that half of the album would be similar in style to his 2003 single "Get Low".  In June that year, recording had started, and Lil Jon announced that he planned to include collaborations with R. Kelly, Mariah Carey, and Snoop Dogg on the album, and the first single from the album sessions, "Snap Yo Fingers" was released, reaching number 7 on the Billboard Hot 100. In January 2007, it was reported that Lil Jon was still in the studio working on the album, and that recorded tracks included "Roll Call" featuring Lil Wayne and Ciara, and tracks featuring R. Kelly and Nate Dogg. The prospective release date at that time was Spring 2007. At this time he was already indicating problems with the record label, stating that he "was going through the drama with TVT Records". By August 2007, the album's release date had slipped again, with late 2007 the expected date. The list of guest artists had by this time expanded to include Game, Ice Cube, P.O.D. and Kid Rock, with Jon explaining that "the concept of the album is that it is merger of rock and hip-hop styles, utilising the different styles of the guest contributors." By November 2007, however, the album was reported to be "65 percent, maybe 70 percent done", with a release now expected in 2008, with Lil Jon taking time out to DJ and do voiceover work in Hollywood. A demo of "What a Night" featuring Jay Sean also recorded, but it not make a final cut in the album version.

By March 2008, the problems with TVT had intensified, with record label TVT described by MTV as having gone from "having money to burn to being on the verge of folding", and Lil Jon said to have experienced legal issues with the label over money. While work on the album was interrupted, with Lil Jon citing the stress of the TVT situation as causing him to taking a complete break from recording the album, he had worked with other artists such as Flo Rida and Pharrell Williams, and had done production work on E-40's Ball Street Journal album. The TVT label filed for bankruptcy in February 2008, putting the album's release into doubt. By August 2008, Lil' Jon had freed himself from his contract with TVT, giving him the rights to the master recordings for Crunk Rock, in return for dropping his objection to the sale of TVT's assets to The Orchard Group. He restarted work on the album and stated that he was considering a new 'World Music' direction for the album and a possible change of title, saying "I'm touching so many different kinds of people on this album as well as keeping my core fan base at the same time." In October 2008, Lil Jon signed to Universal Republic and the album was rescheduled for a release in early 2009. In March 2009, two mixtapes appeared from Lil' Jon, Rockbox Vol. 1 and 2, with Rolling Stone announcing that Crunk Rock was expected later in 2009. Indeed, the second volume closed with Jon stating "Crunk Rock coming sooooooon".

By September 2009 a new date of November 24 was announced for the album's release, although it was still unfinished. Confirmed guests additionally included Roscoe Dash, Mariah Carey, 3OH!3, Whole Wheat Bread, David Guetta, Steve Aoki, LMFAO, Zuper Blahq, DJ Chuckie, Laidback Luke, Elephant Man, Pastor Troy, Ying Yang Twins, Akon, Mario, R. Kelly, T-Pain, Soulja Boy Tell 'Em, and Pitbull. Another single from the album, the RedOne-produced "Give It All U Got", was announced, with a promotional video filmed in Miami in September. Lil Jon stated the album would now be more eclectic than previously envisaged with elements of house music, pop and R&B. By October 2009, Lil Jon described the album as "80 percent done", with all tracks recorded but "some final touches" still required, with the release date pushed back into early 2010. The new single from the album, the disco-tinged "Give It All U Got", was released in November 2009. Lil Jon held a Listening Session for the album in 2010. Rap-Up reported that the album is set for a June 8, 2010 release.
In an interview with Billboard in May 2010 he confirmed that Crunk Rock will be released on June 8. The album was released in standard and deluxe edition.

Singles

Official singles
 "Ms. Chocolate", which features R. Kelly and Mario and was produced by Drumma Boy, was released as the first single on March 30, 2010.
 "Hey", which features 3OH!3 was released as the second single.
 "Machuka", which features Brazilian recording artists Mr. Catra and Mulher Filé, was released as third single only in Brazil.

Promotional singles
 "Snap Yo Fingers" was released as the first promotional single on February 4, 2006. The single peaked at 7 in the United States, and topped the US R&B/Hip Hop and US Rap charts. However, the song did not make it for the album, and it was released as a single only.
 "Act a Fool", which features Three 6 Mafia, was released as the second promotional single on November 7, 2006. It peaked at 91 on the US R&B/Hip-Hop chart. It was not featured in the album.
 "I Do", which features Swizz Beatz and Snoop Dogg, was released as the third promotional single on July 21, 2009. It peaked at 101 on the US R&B/Hip Hop. It was not featured in the album.
 "Give It All U Got", which features Kee on the original version and also features British rapper Tinchy Stryder on the official remix (along with Kee), was released as the fourth promotional single on November 3, 2009. It peaked at 90 on the Canadian Hot 100. However, it did not make the final cut for the album.
 "Outta Your Mind", which features LMFAO, was released as the fifth promotional single on March 23, 2010. It peaked at 28 on Billboard'''s Rap Digital Songs chart. Benny Benassi, DJ Chuckie, A-Trak, David Guetta, Steve Aoki and Travis Barker appear in the music video which was filmed in Miami, Florida. It also debuted at 84 on the Billboard Hot 100.

Reception
 Commercial performance 
The album debuted at number 49 on the US Billboard 200 chart with first-week sales of 8,900 copies. The low number of albums sold was said to be the sales surprise of the week by HipHopDX. It sold 4,700 copies the second week, bring the total to 14,000 copies sold in the US.

 Critical response 

Upon its release, the album received generally mixed reviews from music critics. AllMusic writer David Jeffries gave it 3 out of 5 stars and called it "a scattershot set of tracks that just barely fit together, but take into consideration the label problems and legal issues the producer has faced since the album's conception, and it becomes a scruffy mess you just might cheer on". Emanuel Wallace of RapReviews gave Crunk Rock a 5/10 rating and wrote "If you're looking for lyrical greatness, you'll be disappointed. If you want an album filled with nothing but trunk-rattling beats you'll be disappointed". Slant Magazine writer Jesse Cataldo gave the album 2½ out of 5 stars and described its songs as "thick, silly concoctions, glazed with bass and defined by endless repetition, whirlwinds of chants and shouts that circle like demented carousels". The New York Times writer Jon Caramanica commended the album's production, but ultimately expressed a negative response towards Lil Jon's lyrics, writing "he retains his trademark ignorance and indignation: plenty of the most salacious material here is his own... he’s back to noisily asserting primacy through fight chants". USA Todays Steve Jones gave it 2½ out of 4 stars and shared a similar sentiment, stating "He has mixed more rock and electronica in with the thumping bass lines, but the message remains the same: Get up and jam, or go home".
Slava Kuperstein of HipHopDX'' gave it a 2.5/5 rating and in conclusion of the album said "With the kind of clout Lil Jon has, it's disappointing he wasn't able to come up with a better supporting cast (especially given his features in the past), which makes for an equally disappointing album."

Track listing

Charts

References

Lil Jon albums
2010 debut albums
Albums produced by Drumma Boy
Albums produced by Dr. Luke
Albums produced by Dre & Vidal
Albums produced by Lil Jon
Albums produced by Detail (record producer)
Albums produced by Shawty Redd